Crawford Hallock Greenewalt Jr. (June 3, 1937 – May 4, 2012) was an American classical archaeologist at the University of California, Berkeley who made contributions to the study of Lydia through his excavations at Sardis.

Personal life
Greenewalt was the son of Crawford Hallock Greenewalt, a chemical engineer and later president of the DuPont, and Margaretta L. Greenewalt. He had one brother, David Greenewalt, and one sister, Nancy G. Frederick. He attended the Tower Hill School, received a B.A. from Harvard in 1959, and a Ph.D. in Classical Archaeology from the University of Pennsylvania in 1966. Greenwalt died of a brain tumor in 2012.

Archaeology
Greenewalt first showed in interest in archaeology at age eight. While an undergraduate at Harvard, Greenewalt worked at the Sardis excavation, where he became known for his ability to crawl through the narrow tunnels constructed by earlier tomb robbers. After graduating in 1959, Greenewalt joined the Sardis excavation as a staff photographer. Greenewalt's Ph.D. thesis was on the Lydian pottery, like those recovered at the Sardis excavation. Greenewalt worked on the Sardis excavation every summer from 1959 to 2011. In 1976 he was made the field director of the excavation, a position he held until 2007 when he turned it over to Nicholas Cahill.

Awards and honors
Greenewalt was a member of the American Philosophical Society, and an honorary member the German Archaeological Institute and Austrian Archaeological Institute. In 1993 he was awarded the Henry Allen Moe Prize in Humanities by the American Philosophical Society for his paper "When a Mighty Empire Was Destroyed" and for his work on reconstructing the history of Lydia. In 2012 he was awarded Archaeological Institute of America's Bandelier Award for Public Service to Archaeology for his work at Sardis.

The research library of archaeology at Ege University, Izmir, to which Greenewalt had left his private library, was named "Greenewalt Library" in 2015.

References

Bibliography

External links
 2007 Video Interview with Crawford Greenewalt Jr. by Atomic Heritage Foundation — Voices of the Manhattan Project

American archaeologists
Classical archaeologists
University of California, Berkeley College of Letters and Science faculty
University of Pennsylvania alumni
Harvard University alumni
People from Wilmington, Delaware
1937 births
2012 deaths
Deaths from brain cancer in the United States
Tower Hill School alumni